Stephen Peacocke (born 30 October 1981) is an Australian actor. Peacocke appeared in various theatre productions, before playing minor roles in television dramas and films, including Suburban Mayhem and All Saints. From 2011 until 2016, Peacocke portrayed Darryl Braxton on the television soap opera Home and Away. The role saw Peacocke win the Logie Award for Most Popular Actor twice. Following his departure from Home and Away, Peacocke starred as Detective Josh Levine in the Australia drama series Wanted, and he made appearances in the feature films Whiskey Tango Foxtrot and Me Before You. As of 2023, he stars in the Network Ten drama series Five Bedrooms, Seven Network's RFDS: Royal Flying Doctor Service and the ABC drama series The Newsreader.

Early life
Peacocke was born in Dubbo, New South Wales to Gareth Peacocke, a former accountant, and his wife Sylvia. He has a brother, who encouraged him to pursue acting. Peacocke attended schools in South Dubbo before finishing his secondary education at a Bathurst boarding school. He went on to study communications at the University of Newcastle and took a drama class taught by Glenn Hazeldine, who also encouraged him to take up acting. Peacocke worked numerous labouring jobs in his twenties while trying to start his acting career, including unloading freight trucks and working as a jackaroo for $3 an hour. Peacocke played rugby for the Dubbo Kangaroos, but various injuries led him to theatre work instead. In 2004, Peacocke won a City of Newcastle Drama Award for playing Ricko in a production of A Property of the Clan. He moved to Sydney in order to pursue his acting career and he lived in a share house in Stanmore, where he struggled to make rent before he was cast in Home and Away.

Career
Peacocke appeared in the short play festival Brand Spanking New with actress Bel Deliá, in playwright/director Augusta Supple's work Interrupting Grace directed by Nick Curnow, and also on Supple's later venture Stories from the 428. He also had a role in Kit Brookman's It Was Raining All Afternoon.

Peacocke began his on-screen acting career in 2006 when he appeared in a small role in the Australian film Suburban Mayhem. He started appearing on television in 2007, when he played the role of Zeb Hall in the medical drama series All Saints. His other television credits include Packed to the Rafters, Rake and East West 101. He also appeared in the television film Emerald Falls in 2008, which starred Georgie Parker. Peacocke played a role in a parody of Rihanna's "Umbrella" music video called "Drifting in my cappella" with 1BUCK80. Peacocke appears in the 2011 feature film Burning Man, with Matthew Goode and Bojana Novakovic.

In early 2011, Peacocke received the role of Darryl "Brax" Braxton, a local River Boy, on the Australian soap opera Home and Away. Peacocke also revealed his plans to work in the United States in the future. In 2012, Peacocke won the Logie Award for Most Popular New Male Talent. The following year, he won the Most Popular Actor award. He also received a nomination for the Gold Logie Award for Most Popular Personality on Australian Television. Peacocke announced his departure from Home and Away in February 2015. He filmed his final scenes in late 2014 and he made his last on-screen appearance 10 June 2015. Two months later, Peacocke returned to Home and Away to shoot scenes for a storyline which aired in late 2015.

Peacocke appears as Nic in Whiskey Tango Foxtrot, an adaptation of Kim Barker's memoir The Taliban Shuffle. He also appears in the adaptation of Me Before You as Nathan, opposite Emilia Clarke and Sam Claflin. Peacocke then starred as Detective Josh Levine in the 2016 Australian television series Wanted. He also appeared in the comedy film Cooped Up.

2019 saw Peacocke star alongside Kat Stewart and Hugh Sheridan in Network Ten's drama series Five Bedrooms, which focuses on five people who buy a house together after meeting at a wedding. The series was renewed for a second season, which began airing in August 2021, after a production delay due to the COVID-19 pandemic. After starring in war film Danger Close: The Battle of Long Tan, Peacocke joined the cast of comedy drama Squinters for its second season, and appeared in the drama Les Norton. 

Peacocke starred in the Nine Network miniseries Informer 3838 as Detective Paul Dale, who heads up the Victorian Police drug squad, until he is wrongfully arrested and imprisoned. Peacocke plays flight nurse Pete Emerson in the 2021 drama series RFDS: Royal Flying Doctor Service. He carried out his own research to prepare for the role, including talking with people who worked with the Flying Doctor Service and training with a nurse. Peacocke also stars in the ABC drama series The Newsreader, which is set in a 1986 television newsroom. For his performance as sports reporter Rob Rickards, Peacocke earned an AACTA Award nomination for Best Guest or Supporting Actor in a Television Drama.

In February 2023, it was announced that Peacocke had joined the cast of Nine's crime drama Human Error, alongside Leeanna Walsman and Rahel Romahn. Production on the six-part series began that same month in Melbourne. Peacocke plays Detective Dylan Mackenzie.

Personal life
Peacocke has been in a relationship with actress Bridgette Sneddon since 2005. The couple met at the University of Western Sydney. The couple announced their engagement on 7 March 2014 and married on the 24 December 2014 in a private ceremony.

Filmography

Awards and nominations

References

External links

 
 Steve Peacocke at Yahoo!7

1981 births
Australian male film actors
Australian male soap opera actors
Living people
Logie Award winners
People from Dubbo
University of Newcastle (Australia) alumni